Berberis valenzuelae is a shrub in the Berberidaceae described as a species in 1992. It is endemic to the páramo de Fontibon in the Norte de Santander region of Colombia.

References

valdiviana
Flora of Colombia
Páramo flora
Plants described in 1992